Young Georgian Lolitaz is a Georgian indie rock band. They represented Georgia in the Eurovision Song Contest 2016 as Nika Kocharov & Young Georgian Lolitaz with the song "Midnight Gold". They are the first all-male band to represent Georgia in the contest.

The band consists of vocalist and guitarist Nika Kocharov, vocalist and bassist Giorgi Marr, guitarist and keyboardist Levan Shanshiashvili, and drummer Dimitri Oganesian.

The band have one studio album; Lemonjuice (released in 2009) and one EP; The Lava EP (released in 2010) in their discography so far. In 2017, they returned with a new single entitled 'Dark Device'. Kocharov has said in interviews that he is influenced by The Beatles, Blur and Pulp, whilst Marr's is Oasis.

References

Musical groups from Georgia (country)
Musical groups established in 2000
Rock music groups from Georgia (country)
2000 establishments in Georgia (country)
Eurovision Song Contest entrants for Georgia (country)
Eurovision Song Contest entrants of 2016